Dmytro Matthew Lazorko (November 8, 1908 – April 15, 1982) was a farmer and political figure in Saskatchewan. He represented Redberry from 1944 to 1948 in the Legislative Assembly of Saskatchewan as a Co-operative Commonwealth Federation (CCF) member.

He was the son of Michael Lazorko and Annie Ruzesky, Ukrainian immigrants, and was educated in Borden, Saskatchewan. Lazorko went on to study agriculture at the University of Saskatchewan. In 1931, he married Anne Michalenko. He retired from farming in 1943 and moved to Borden, where he found work in a garage. He was a member of the United Farmers of Canada, a director for the Borden Co-op Association and secretary for the Concordia School. Lazorko also served on the town council for Borden. He was defeated when he ran for reelection to the provincial assembly in 1948. In 1963, he moved to Creston, British Columbia.

References 

Saskatchewan Co-operative Commonwealth Federation MLAs
20th-century Canadian politicians
1908 births
1982 deaths
Canadian people of Ukrainian descent
Canadian socialists of Ukrainian descent
Canadian socialists